Elijah Wynder (born March 10, 2003) is an American professional soccer player who plays as a midfielder for USL Championship club Louisville City FC.

Club career
Wynder signed a USL Academy contract with USL Championship side Louisville City on April 10, 2019. He made his professional debut though for the club on August 15, 2020, against Loudoun United. He came on as a 67th minute substitute for Corben Bone as Louisville City won 2–0. A month after signing with the first team, Wynder suffered a season ending injury, missing the entire 2021 season.

Louisville loaned Wynder to FC Tucson on February 10, 2022, with the option to recall Wynder after June 1, 2022. On July 9, Louisville announced that they would recall Wynder from his loan after 12 appearances for Tucson.

Personal life
Wynder is the older brother of Louisville City FC defender Joshua Wynder.

Career statistics

Club

Honors
Individual
USL Championship Comeback Player of the Year: 2022

References

External links
Profile at the Louisville City website

2003 births
Living people
People from Kentucky
American soccer players
Association football midfielders
Louisville City FC players
FC Tucson players
USL Championship players
USL League One players
Soccer players from Kentucky